In sports that use a clock, untimed play is play in which the clock does not tick. In some cases, untimed play can occur at the end of a game following the expiration of the clock, and may even be when a score occurs that decides the outcome of the game.

Gridiron football
In gridiron football, untimed play occurs in the following situations:
 Extra points following touchdowns are attempted without the clock ticking (except in arena football, which uses a continuously running clock except in the last minute of a half)
 If the clock expires while a play is in progress, the play continues untimed until the ball is dead
 If, at the end of a quarter or a half, a defensive foul occurs, the offense is entitled to an untimed down
 Specifically in Canadian football, if the clock expires while the ball is dead, play continues with one untimed down. (This is in contrast to American football, where if the ball is dead and time expires, the half or game immediately ends.)
 In leagues that use the Kansas playoff for overtime (including Canadian, college and most high school football), all overtime play is untimed.
 In the NFL, field goal attempts—unless they land in the field of play—are limited to five seconds.  Should such a field goal attempt take longer than five seconds to complete, the excess will be untimed.
 Also in the NFL, kickoffs and safety kicks are untimed unless, and until, the receiving team attempts to return the kick.

All untimed downs are subject to the play clock and must commence before it expires, or else a delay of game penalty is levied.

Basketball
In basketball, untimed play occurs in the following situations:
 Free throws are shot without the clock ticking, though in the NBA, there is a 10-second clock to shoot a free throw or else it is forfeited.
 At the end of the game, the buzzer automatically ends the game. However, if a player has released the ball from his hands before the buzzer sounds and the ball makes it through the basket, the score counts.
 When the ball is put in play by being inbounded, the play is untimed until touched by a player on the court.  The player on the court closest to the ball will sometimes take advantage of this by delaying touching the ball for as long as possible by high-bouncing or rolling the ball down the court towards their teammate, buying his or her team a bit more time to shoot before the shot clock or game clock expires.
 In 3x3, a formalized version of the 3-on-3 halfcourt game, overtime is untimed. The game ends by rule once either team scores 2 points in overtime, with shots from behind the "three-point" arc worth 2 points and all other shots (whether field goals or free throws) worth 1 point.
 The Basketball Tournament, an annual offseason event in the U.S., uses the Elam Ending, an untimed end-of-game procedure, in all games. In the TBT implementation, the game clock proceeds normally until the first dead ball with 4:00 or less remaining in the fourth quarter. At that point, a "target score" is set by adding 8 points (originally 7; increased in 2019) to the score of the leading team. The game then resumes, with the shot clock fully operational but the game clock shut off. The first team to reach or exceed the target score wins the game.

Ice hockey
In hockey, mid-game penalty shots and post-game shootouts are untimed.

References

Terminology used in multiple sports